Chemman Cherry, also known as Semmancheri, is a panchayat town in Chennai Metro City at Kancheepuram district in the Indian state of Tamil Nadu.

Chemman Cherry is a suburban area in South Chennai located, close to Siruseri IT Park and next to Sholinganallur on IT highway (Rajiv Gandhi salai) chennai-600119. Prime location which has Sathyabama University, National Maritime University, and Semmancheri Slum Clearance Board. New high-rise towers in gated-community by DLF (Garden city), Bollineni (Hillside) and AWHO (Army Welfare Housing Organization) are here.  Semmanchery has a small ancient temple (Srinivasa Perumal temple). Also upcoming Metro train station(Line 3) and has star hotels such as The Elite Grand, Marriott and Sheraton.

Cities and towns in Kanchipuram district